Batowo  (formerly ) is a village in the administrative district of Gmina Lipiany, within Pyrzyce County, West Pomeranian Voivodeship, in north-western Poland.

Before 1945 the area belonged to Germany as part of Landkreis Soldin in the Prussian Province of Brandenburg. During the Thirty Years' War Batowo was so badly destroyed, that during the restoration it was moved to another place. For more history of the region, see Neumark.

References

Batowo